The LiteWing Aircraft LiteTrike, also called The Lite Trike, is an American ultralight trike that was designed and produced by LiteWing Aircraft of Caryville, Tennessee in the late 1990s. The aircraft was supplied fully assembled.

Design and development
It features a very minimalist design, a cable-braced hang glider-style high-wing, weight-shift controls, a single-seat, open cockpit, tricycle landing gear and a single engine in pusher configuration.

The aircraft is made from bolted-together aluminum tubing, with its single or double-surface wing covered in Dacron sailcloth. Its  span wing is supported by a single tube-type kingpost and uses an "A" frame control bar. The engine factory supplied was the  Zenoah G-25 single cylinder, two-stroke powerplant although the carriage can support engines up to the  Rotax 447. Although the standard model did not include a cockpit fairing, one was an available factory option.

The LiteTrike was designed to use any hang glider wing that the owner might have and to facilitate this the manufacturer provided strengthening kits with keel sleeves and thicker flying wires. When equipped with the Rotax 447 engine a stronger wing is required and the factory also supplied purpose-designed trike wings for this role.

Twenty examples had been flown by February 2000.

Specifications (LiteTrike)

References

1990s United States ultralight aircraft
Single-engined pusher aircraft
Ultralight trikes
LiteWing Aircraft aircraft